Corybas unguiculatus, commonly known as the small helmet orchid or pelicans, is a species of terrestrial orchid endemic to south-eastern Australia. It is a widespread, sometimes common but small orchid with a single leaf and a single reddish purple to reddish black flower.

Description
The leaf is greyish green on the upper surface and reddish on the lower side. There are a few small teeth on the edge of the labellum. Flowering occurs from May to August.

Taxonomy
The small helmet orchid was first formally described in 1810 by Robert Brown, who gave it the name Corysanthes unguiculata and published the description in his book Prodromus Florae Novae Hollandiae et Insulae Van Diemen. In 1871 Heinrich Gustav Reichenbach changed the name to Corybas unguiculatus. The specific epithet (unguiculatus) is a Latin word meaning "hooved".

Distribution and habitat
Corybas unguiculatus is a widespread, sometimes common species which grows in heath and heathy forest. It occurs in New South Wales south from Gosford, in southern Victoria, in the far south-east of South Australia and in Tasmania.

Conservation
Although sometimes common in other states, C. unguiculatus is listed as "rare" in South Australia. The main threats to the species in that state are habitat loss, grazing by slugs and snails and weed invasion.

References

undulatus
Endemic orchids of Australia
Orchids of New South Wales
Orchids of Victoria (Australia)
Orchids of South Australia
Orchids of Tasmania
Plants described in 1810